Frank Plagge (born 18 April 1963) is a retired German footballer and manager. As a player, he spent one season in the Bundesliga with Eintracht Braunschweig, as well as three seasons in the 2. Bundesliga with Braunschweig and VfL Wolfsburg.

References

External links
 

1963 births
Living people
German footballers
German football managers
Eintracht Braunschweig players
VfL Wolfsburg players
Association football forwards
Bundesliga players
2. Bundesliga players
West German footballers